Anogeissus bentii is a species of plant in the Combretaceae family. It is endemic to the fog woodlands of Yemen.

References

Endemic flora of Yemen
bentii
Endangered plants
Taxonomy articles created by Polbot
Trees of the Arabian Peninsula
Taxobox binomials not recognized by IUCN